Nicolas Clark Adamson CVO OBE (born 5 September 1938) was Private Secretary to Prince Edward, Duke of Kent from 1993 to 2011.

Career 
Adamson joined the RAF in 1959 and served in various fighter squadrons based in the United Kingdom and the Middle East (1960–65). After becoming a Flight Lieutenant in 1962, he was later chosen as an aide-de-camp to the CDS (1967–69). In 1969, he was seconded to diplomatic service before moving to his recent role in the Royal Household. He is a Fellow of the Royal Aeronautical Society.

References

1938 births
Living people
English people of Scottish descent
People from Cumbria
People educated at St Edward's School, Oxford
Commanders of the Royal Victorian Order
Officers of the Order of the British Empire